The Moyez Manzil is a British Raj-era mansion in Faridpur, Bangladesh. It was built by the merchant zamindar Chowdhury Moyezuddin Bishwash.

Surroundings
Moyez Manzil is situated right at the heart of the old colonial town and is just adjacent to the Circuit House. It stands still quite impressively, on 27 bighas of land with gardens, orchards and lawns and is painted in a dazzling white. Some members of the family reside inside the compound. Originally the compound was over 55 bighas, but in early 1900s, the plots on which the current Halima Girls High School and Moyezuddin High School were separated out of the main block of land through the making of some roads through them.

History
Construction finished in 1885. The palace was built at a cost of 11 lakh of rupees, an amount donated by each Zamindar of the family from their annual incomes. The palace is the one of the most impressive among the several built by the family. It was again renovated in 1916. The family also built several other palaces across Faridpur. They include Bishwash Bari Palace, Chowdhury Bari Palace and Bishwash Bari II. The remaining ones are located in Chanpur and stand across a continuous block of 600 bighas ( 200 acres ) of land and the biggest of them has 172 bedrooms.

Chowdhury Moyezuddin Bishwash, the legendary Zamindar of Faridpur and also head of the family moved into the palace in 1886 making it the official seat of the vast estate which covered most of Faridpur. The palace was home to Moyezuddin's sons: eminent anti-British revolutionists Chowdhury Abdallah Zaheeruddin (Lal Mia), Yusuf Ali Chowdhury Mohon Mia and Enayet Hossain Chowdhury Tara Mia who became leading politicians in the Pakistan era. It also hosted political, socio-economic and cultural conventions. Moyez Manzil was the only palace outside Dhaka in the whole of East Bengal to be visited regularly by the great political leaders of the subcontinent. They included Netaji Subhash Chandra Bose, Sher-e-Bangla A. K. Fazlul Huq, Huseyn Shaheed Suhrawardy and Sir Muhammad Zafrulla Khan. The place has been visited also by Mahatma Gandhi, celebrated actors and actresses of Indian film industry from the 1930 and 1940s, and most of the eminent politicians including Presidents and Prime Ministers of Pakistan across the 1950 and 1960s.

It has several dozen bed rooms across 4 buildings, a beautiful mosque, mausoleum of Chowdhury Moyezuddin Bishwash and his immediate family members, and 2 large ponds.

External links 
 http://www.thedailystar.net/heritage...1/heritage.htm

Palaces in Bangladesh